Dominique Frémy (5 May 1931 – 2 October 2008) was the creator of the Quid encyclopedia. His spouse Michèle and son Fabrice participated in writing it as well.
Frémy attended the Cours Hattemer, a private school. He was a diplomaed student of the Institut d'Études Politiques de Paris and of the Faculté des lettres de Paris. He was employed by Shell in London, but quit his job to produce a new encyclopedia with his wife, Dominique. It began in 1963, named Quid.

References

External links 
 Official site of Quid

Writers from Paris
1931 births
2008 deaths
Burials at Passy Cemetery
French encyclopedists
French publishers (people)
Lycée Condorcet alumni
Sciences Po alumni
Commandeurs of the Ordre des Arts et des Lettres
Chevaliers of the Légion d'honneur